A colander (or cullender) is a kitchen utensil used to strain foods such as pasta or to rinse vegetables. The perforated nature of the colander allows liquid to drain through while retaining the solids inside. It is sometimes also called a pasta strainer or kitchen sieve.

Description and history
Traditionally, colanders are made of a light metal, such as aluminium or thinly rolled stainless steel. Colanders are also made of plastic, silicone, ceramic, and enamelware.

The word colander comes from the Latin colum, meaning sieve.

Types of colanders

 Bowl- or cone-shaped – the traditional colander
 Mated colander pot

Other uses

The colander in the form of a pasta strainer was adopted as the religious headgear of the religion Pastafarianism in deference to the Flying Spaghetti Monster.

See also
 Chinois
 Filter
 Zaru

References

External links 
 
 
 Colander vs Strainer

Food preparation utensils
Filters
Religious headgear